Baroque Records is an electronic music label created by Mick Parks and Mick Wilson of Tilt.  It has featured singles from Quivver, Tilt, Benz & MD, and Shiloh.

External links
Official Website

Electronic music record labels
British record labels